Nagda Simla Union is a union of Gopalpur Upazila, Tangail District, Bangladesh. It is situated 8 km southeast of Gopalpur and 55 km north of Tangail, the District headquarters.

Demographics

According to Population Census 2011 performed by Bangladesh Bureau of Statistics, the total population of Nagda Simla union is 31436. There are 7624 households in total.

Education

The literacy rate of Nagda Simla Union is 47.5% (Male-50.3%, Female-44.7%).

See also
 Union Councils of Tangail District

References

Populated places in Dhaka Division
Populated places in Tangail District
Unions of Gopalpur Upazila